In the theory of relativity, it is convenient to express results in terms of a spacetime coordinate system relative to an implied observer. In many (but not all) coordinate systems, an event is specified by one time coordinate and three spatial coordinates. The time specified by the time coordinate is referred to as coordinate time to distinguish it from proper time.

In the special case of an inertial observer in special relativity, by convention the coordinate time at an event is the same as the proper time measured by a clock that is at the same location as the event, that is stationary relative to the observer and that has been synchronised to the observer's clock using the Einstein synchronisation convention.

Coordinate time, proper time, and clock synchronization 

A fuller explanation of the concept of coordinate time arises from its relations with proper time and with clock synchronization.  Synchronization, along with the related concept of simultaneity, has to receive careful definition in the framework of general relativity theory, because many of the assumptions inherent in classical mechanics and classical accounts of space and time had to be removed.  Specific clock synchronization procedures were defined by Einstein and give rise to a limited concept of simultaneity.  

Two events are called simultaneous in a chosen reference frame if and only if the chosen coordinate time has the same value for both of them; and this condition allows for the physical possibility and likelihood that they will not be simultaneous from the standpoint of another reference frame.  

But outside special relativity, the coordinate time is not a time that could be measured by a clock located at the place that nominally defines the reference frame, e.g. a clock located at the solar system barycenter would not measure the coordinate time of the barycentric reference frame, and a clock located at the geocenter would not measure the coordinate time of a geocentric reference frame.

Mathematics

For non-inertial observers, and in general relativity, coordinate systems can be chosen more freely. For a clock whose spatial coordinates are constant, the relationship between proper time τ (Greek lowercase tau) and coordinate time t, i.e. the rate of time dilation, is given by 

where g00 is a component of the metric tensor, which incorporates gravitational time dilation (under the convention that the zeroth component is timelike).

An alternative formulation, correct to the order of terms in 1/c2, gives the relation between proper and coordinate time in terms of more-easily recognizable quantities in dynamics:

in which:
 

is a sum of gravitational potentials due to the masses in the neighborhood, based on their distances ri from the clock. This sum of the terms GMi/ri is evaluated approximately, as a sum of Newtonian gravitational potentials (plus any tidal potentials considered), and is represented using the positive astronomical sign convention for gravitational potentials.

Also c is the speed of light, and v is the speed of the clock (in the coordinates of the chosen reference frame) defined by:  

where dx, dy, dz and dtc are small increments in three orthogonal spacelike coordinates x, y, z and in the coordinate time tc of the clock's position in the chosen reference frame.

Equation is a fundamental and much-quoted differential equation for the relation between proper time and coordinate time, i.e. for time dilation.  A derivation, starting from the Schwarzschild metric, with further reference sources, is given in Time dilation due to gravitation and motion together.

Measurement

The coordinate times cannot be measured, but only computed from the (proper-time) readings of real clocks with the aid of the time dilation relationship shown in equation (or some alternative or refined form of it).  

Even such an illustration is of limited use because the coordinate time is defined everywhere in the reference frame, while the hypothetical observer and clock chosen to illustrate it has only a limited choice of trajectory.

Coordinate time scales 

A coordinate time scale (or coordinate time standard) is a time standard designed for use as the time coordinate in calculations that need to take account of relativistic effects.  The choice of a time coordinate implies the choice of an entire frame of reference.

As described above, a time coordinate can to a limited extent be illustrated by the proper time of a clock that is notionally infinitely far away from the objects of interest and at rest with respect to the chosen reference frame. This notional clock, because it is outside all gravity wells, is not influenced by gravitational time dilation. The proper time of objects within a gravity well will pass more slowly than the coordinate time even when they are at rest with respect to the coordinate reference frame.

There are four purpose-designed coordinate time scales defined by the IAU for use in astronomy.  Barycentric Coordinate Time (TCB) is based on a reference frame comoving with the barycenter of the Solar System, and has been defined for use in calculating motion of bodies within the Solar System.  However, from the standpoint of Earth-based observers, general time dilation including gravitational time dilation causes Barycentric Coordinate Time, which is based on the SI second, to appear when observed from the Earth to have time units that pass more quickly than SI seconds measured by an Earth-based clock, with a rate of divergence of about 0.5 seconds per year. Accordingly, for many practical astronomical purposes, a scaled modification of TCB has been defined, called for historical reasons Barycentric Dynamical Time (TDB), with a time unit that evaluates to SI seconds when observed from the Earth's surface, thus assuring that at least for several millennia TDB will remain within 2 milliseconds of Terrestrial Time (TT), albeit that the time unit of TDB, if measured by the hypothetical observer described above, at rest in the reference frame and at infinite distance, would be very slightly slower than the SI second (by 1 part in 1/LB = 1 part in 108/1.550519768). 

Geocentric Coordinate Time (TCG) is based on a reference frame comoving with the geocenter (the center of the Earth), and is defined in principle for use for calculations concerning phenomena on or in the region of the Earth, such as planetary rotation and satellite motions.  To a much smaller extent than with TCB compared with TDB, but for a corresponding reason, the SI second of TCG when observed from the Earth's surface shows a slight acceleration on the SI seconds realized by Earth-surface-based clocks.  Accordingly, Terrestrial Time (TT) has also been defined as a scaled version of TCG, with the scaling such that on the defined geoid the unit rate is equal to the SI second, albeit that in terms of TCG the SI second of TT is a very little slower (this time by 1 part in 1/LG = 1 part in 1010/6.969290134).

See also

Absolute time and space
Introduction to special relativity
Introduction to the mathematics of general relativity

References

Theory of relativity
Time scales